HMS Leven, was a 20-gun sixth-rate post ship (sometimes referred to as a sloop) of the Cyrus class, for the Royal Navy. She was built in Ipswich, and launched on 23 December 1813. She was notable as the survey ship that mapped large stretches of the coast of Africa in a voyage from 1821 to 1826, under the command of Captain William Fitzwilliam Owen. Leven Point near Cape Vidal in KwaZulu-Natal, South Africa, is named after the ship.

Napoleonic wars
After commissioning at Woolwich in October 1814, Leven was employed on the coast of La Vendee during Napoleon Bonaparte's final campaign, under the command of Captain Buckland Stirling Bluett.

Survey service
She was decommissioned at Chatham in 1816, and, in August 1818, she was transferred to the Royal Navy's Survey Service under the command of Captain David Ewen Bartholomew, who set off to survey part of the west African coast and the Cape Verde Islands. Bartholomew died at Porto Praya in Santiago on 19 February 1821; his first lieutenant, Robert Baldey, returned Leven to Spithead on 23 July, after an abortive attempt to map the River Gambia.

Command of the ship passed to Captain William Fitzwilliam Owen, who had risen to prominence following his surveys of the Great Lakes. In August 1821, in the company of the brig-sloop , Leven  departed for Africa again, with orders to map eastward from the Cape of Good Hope. Amending orders later extended the mission to include a survey of the entire east coast of Africa as well as southern Arabia, Madagascar, and several island groups in the Indian Ocean. On their return journey, long stretches of the west African coastline and the River Gambia were surveyed, several slave ships were apprehended and support was given to British forces in the First Anglo-Ashanti War. By the time Leven returned home late in 1826, she had surveyed  of coast and prepared 83 charts. This had been achieved at a terrible cost; half the crew of the two little ships had been killed by tropical diseases.

Lloyd's List (LL) for 20 June 1823 reported a letter from the Cape dated 2 April. The brig Singapore, of Bengal, had arrived the day before. Leven had found her near Delagoa Bay in the hands of the Portuguese government. Only one of her crew was still alive; the master and all the rest had died of disease. The government had landed her cargo. Captain Owen prevailed on the government to reload the cargo. He then put a crew on board Singapore and sent her into the Cape. There was another vessel at Delagoa Bay, the schooner Orange Grove, which too had lost all but her master and supercargo, and whose cargo too the government had landed. Orange Grove sailed to the Cape in company with Singapore.

Harbour duties
Leven was decommissioned in February 1827, and was fitted out as a hospital ship. By 1830, she was a prison hulk at Chatham and, in 1842, was the receiving ship at Limehouse. She was finally broken-up in July 1848.

Citations

References

External links
 
Narrative of a Voyage of Discovery to Africa and Arabia, performed in His Majesty's Ships, Leven and Barracouta, from 1821 to 1826, under the command of Capt. F. W. Owen, R. N

 

1813 ships
Exploration ships of the United Kingdom
Cyrus-class post ships
Exploration of Africa
Prison ships
Survey vessels of the Royal Navy